Kamil Majchrzak (born 13 January 1996) is a Polish professional tennis player. He has a career high ATP singles ranking of World No. 75 achieved on 28 February 2022 and a career high ATP doubles ranking of World No. 241 achieved on 8 August 2016. He is currently the No. 2 Polish singles player.

Junior career
Partnered with Martin Redlicki, Majchrzak won the 2013 US Open boys' doubles title by defeating Quentin Halys and Frederico Ferreira Silva in the final.

Professional career

2019: Grand Slam debut and first two wins, Top 100
During the 2019 Australian Open, Majchrzak advanced through the qualifying to reach the 1st round. He won the first two sets against top-10 player Kei Nishikori, but then was forced to retire due to an injury.

In March 2019 Majchrzak celebrated his maiden Challenger triumph at the 2019 Open Harmonie mutuelle in St. Brieuc, France. Two months later he advanced to the 2019 Prosperita Open final with wins over Riccardio Bonadio, Zsombor Piros, No. 5 seeded Dennis Novak, top seed Lloyd Harris and Jannik Sinner to lift his second ATP Challenger trophy.

Majchrzak made the semifinals of the 2019 Ilkley Trophy Challenger and then qualified for Wimbledon without dropping a set. In the first round at Wimbledon he lost to Fernando Verdasco. At the 2019 Hall of Fame Open in Rhode Island he defeated Alastair Gray before losing a three set match to No. 1 seed John Isner in the second round. As a result he reached the top 100 on 29 July 2019.

At the 2019 US Open, Majchrzak lost in the final round of qualifying. With the sudden withdrawal of Milos Raonic, he came in as a lucky loser, and defeated Nicolás Jarry and Pablo Cuevas - both in five-set thrillers to reach the third round at a Grand Slam for the first time in his career. He fell to Grigor Dimitrov in straight sets in the third round. He reached a new career-high of No. 83 on 23 September.

2020: Inaugural ATP Cup, Injury and return
At the start of the year, Majchrzak participated in the inaugural 2020 ATP Cup before suffering from a broken pelvic bone. Subsequently Majchrzak had to withdraw from the 2020 Australian Open and Maharashtra Open due to a groin injury. He would not compete again for more than seven months.

In August he returned to tennis and participated at the US Open where he lost to Ernesto Escobedo in the first round. He then transitioned to clay courts and on 13 September 2020 won his third Challenger title at the 2020 Czech Open. In the final, he defeated top seed and defending champion Pablo Andújar.

Majchrzak entered at the 2020 French Open with a protected ranking. In the first round he lost to 15th seeded Karen Khachanov.

2021: Masters & Olympics debut, First ATP quarterfinal
Majchrzak started his season at the 2021 Great Ocean Road Open in Melbourne, Australia, which was organized as a lead-up tournament to the 2021 Australian Open. He entered under a protected ranking and in the first round defeated Laslo Đere in straight sets.

He used his protected ranking as well to enter the main draw of the 2021 French Open and also reached the second round with a win over Arthur Cazaux.

Majchrzak qualified to represent Poland at the 2020 Summer Olympics where he was defeated by Miomir Kecmanovic in the first round.

Majchrzak qualified at the 2021 Sofia Open as a lucky loser after the withdrawal of fourth seed Alexander Bublik. He reached the quarterfinals of an ATP tournament for the first time in his career by defeating wildcard Dimitar Kuzmanov.

2022: ATP Cup semifinalist, top 75, provisional doping suspension  
At the 2022 ATP Cup, Majchrzak won all his three matches and helped Poland reach the semifinals for the first time, before testing positive for COVID-19 and having to withdraw late from the tournament. As a result he was unable to participate at the 2022 Australian Open qualifications where he was seeded fourth and thus possibly missing the first Grand Slam of the year. He nevertheless entered the main draw after replacing Jenson Brooksby who withdrew due to COVID-19. He reached the second round for the first time at this Major with a win over Andreas Seppi. Majchrzak lost to Alex de Minaur in the second round.

At the 2022 Tata Open Maharashtra he reached the semifinals of an ATP tournament for the first time in his career defeating second seed Lorenzo Musetti. As a result he reached the top 75 in the rankings on 28 February 2022.

In May at the 2022 Geneva Open he clinched the biggest win of his career defeating 8th seed and World No. 41 Alexander Bublik in the first round in straight sets.
He reached the quarterfinals only for the third time in his career defeating qualifier Marco Cecchinato. 

In September at the 2022 Sofia Open he reached his third tour-level quarterfinal of the season, for a second year in a row, defeating eight seed Oscar Otte. He lost to eventual champion Marc-Andrea Huesler. At the 2022 Busan Open in South Korea, he won his fourth Challenger title defeating Radu Albot. As a result he moved 20 positions up back into the top 100 at No. 82 on 24 October 2022.

On 9 December 2022, the International Tennis Integrity Agency announced that Majchrzak has been provisionally suspended after testing positive for banned substances at the Sofia Open, the Japan Open and the Seoul Challenger.

Performance timeline

Singles 
Current through the 2022 Miami Open.

Challenger and Futures finals

Singles: 22 (12–10)

Doubles: 11 (6–5)

Juniors

Junior Grand Slam Finals

Doubles: 1 (1 title)

Olympic medal matches

Singles

Mixed doubles

Record against top 10 players

Majchrzak's record against those who have been ranked in the top 10, with active players in boldface.

Notes

References

External links

 
 
 

Polish male tennis players
1996 births
Living people
Sportspeople from Piotrków Trybunalski
Tennis players at the 2014 Summer Youth Olympics
US Open (tennis) junior champions
Grand Slam (tennis) champions in boys' doubles
Youth Olympic gold medalists for Poland
Olympic tennis players of Poland
Tennis players at the 2020 Summer Olympics
21st-century Polish people